The 2018 Volta ao Alentejo–Crédito Argícola was 36th edition of the Volta ao Alentejo cycle race and was held on 14 March to 18 March 2018.

Teams 

The 21 teams invited to the race were:

Stages

Classification leadership 

 In stage two, Justin Jules, who was second in the points classification, wore the black jersey, because first placed Gabriel Cullaigh wore the yellow jersey as leader of the general classification.
 In stage two, Mark Downey, who was second in the best young rider classification, wore the white jersey, because first placed Gabriel Cullaigh wore the yellow jersey as leader of the general classification.
 In stage three, Gabriel Cullaigh, who was second in the best young rider classification, wore the white jersey, because first placed Mark Downey wore the yellow jersey as leader of the general classification.
 In stage four, Gabriel Cullaigh, who was second in the best young rider classification, wore the white jersey, because first placed Mark Downey wore the yellow jersey as leader of the general classification.
 In stage five, Fernando Barceló, who was second in the best young rider classification, wore the white jersey, because first placed Mark Downey wore the yellow jersey as leader of the general classification.

Final standings

General classification

Points classification

Mountains classification

Young rider classification

Team classification

References

External links 
 

2018 UCI Europe Tour
2018 in Portuguese sport